All You Need Is Now is the thirteenth studio album by English new wave band Duran Duran. Produced by Mark Ronson, a truncated version of the album was released digitally on 21 December 2010. A physical package was released on 21 March 2011 in Europe on the Tape Modern label (distributed by Edel), and on 22 March 2011 in the United States and Canada on S-Curve Records (distributed by Universal).

The album peaked at number 11 in the UK, becoming the band's 13th Top 20 album. It debuted at number 119 on the US Billboard 200 chart on its initial December 2010 digital release, selling 15,000 copies in its first week. It reached number 29 upon its physical release in March 2011. The album had sold 76,000 copies in the US as of August 2015. Duran Duran promoted the album through the All You Need Is Now tour.

Background and release
According to John Taylor, producer Matthew Hager worked on tracks for the March 2011 extended release of the album. Some of these songs are "Networker Nation", released as a bonus track, and "Early Summer Nerves" and "Too Close to the Sun", appearing only on the Best Buy exclusive edition. The Best Buy edition also includes a bonus DVD featuring seven videos.

Nick Rhodes described "This Lost Weekend" as a "slow song" sounding "like Motown", saying it is "nothing like anything on the album". Although it did not make it onto the final track listing, it was included on the deluxe collector's edition of the album, which was made available to order exclusively from The Vinyl Factory, containing five vinyl records. It was also later included on the Japanese two-disc CD version of All You Need Is Now. The Japanese album was released as a stand-alone album and as part of a six-disc combo along with the live concert film A Diamond in the Mind on Blu-ray and DVD video and two-disc live album, with the two-disc All You Need Is Now completing the package.

Critical reception

All You Need Is Now currently holds a score of 74 out of 100 on Metacritic, certifying generally favourable reviews. Crispin Kott of PopMatters dubbed it "the best album Duran Duran has released since Rio". Rolling Stone viewed the album as "a return to roots for a band that's all implants – which is part of the album's charm." Sarah Rodman from The Boston Globe praised the album and said "Simon LeBon's still sturdy voice soars over coolly funky backdrops and the grooves are some of the group's most urgent in years." In the March 2011 issue, Mojo gave the album 4 out of 5 (meaning "Brilliant") and stated, "Take Roxy Music, add Kraftwerk, and sprinkle on some Chic, and the result is Duran Duran".

Singles
"All You Need Is Now" was the first single released from the album. It was initially released on iTunes on 8 December 2010 as a free download. The music video is directed by Nick Egan. Several remixes were released as bonus tracks on the album. Because it was released as a free download, the single was ineligible for the UK sales charts. The song peaked at number 38 on Billboards Adult Pop Songs chart.

The second single, "Girl Panic!", was released as a limited-edition seven-inch single for Record Store Day 2011 (16 April 2011) with a remix by David Lynch. The music video was directed by Jonas Åkerlund and released on 8 November 2011, featuring appearances by Naomi Campbell, Eva Herzigova, Cindy Crawford, Helena Christensen, and Yasmin Le Bon portraying Simon Le Bon, Nick Rhodes, John Taylor, Roger Taylor, and Dominic Brown, respectively.

"Leave a Light On" was released as a promotional single in the United Kingdom. It was officially released for the British market after that BBC Radio 2 apparently refused to play the intended single "Girl Panic!" on the verge of the (later cancelled) UK leg in their new world tour. The song peaked at number 31 on Billboards Adult Pop Songs chart.

Track listing

Personnel
Credits adapted from the liner notes of All You Need Is Now.

Duran Duran
 Simon Le Bon
 Nick Rhodes
 John Taylor
 Roger Taylor

Additional musicians
 Dom Brown – guitars, guitar synth
 Ana Matronic – vocals 
 Kelis – vocals 
 Owen Pallett – string arrangements, conducting 
 The St. Kitts String Octet – strings 
 Nina Hossain – newscaster ; voice of satellite navigation 
 Nino Rota – orchestral sample 
 Franco Ferrara – orchestral sample conducting 
 Anna Ross – female backing vocals 
 Tawiah – female backing vocals 
 Mark Ronson – additional chorus guitar 
 Jamie Walton – cello

Technical
 Mark Ronson – production
 Duran Duran – production
 Joshua Blair – recording, editing
 Alalal – additional recording
 Samuel Navel – additional recording, engineering assistance
 Dan Parry – additional recording, engineering assistance
 Nick Taylor – additional recording, engineering assistance
 Mark "Spike" Stent – mixing at Mixsuite (Los Angeles)
 Matty Green – mixing assistance
 Ted Jensen – mastering at Sterling Sound (New York City)
 James Anderson – string recording

Artwork
 Clunie Reid – artwork
 Nick Rhodes – original photography
 Rory McCartney – design
 Ashley Heath – art direction
 Rory McCartney – art direction

Charts

Notes

References

External links

2010 albums
Albums produced by Mark Ronson
Duran Duran albums
S-Curve Records albums